Bloom Image Editor, formerly known as Ormr, is a non-destructive, node-based vector and raster image editor for Mac OS X, Windows, and Linux. Bloom features selection, painting, retouching, color correction tools, as well as layer-based image editing. Every operation is preserved individually and is editable at any point in time.

Features 
 Node-based compositing.
 Non-destructive workflow.
 Support for 16-bit high color images.
 Photoshop images with layers are supported as well as other popular still image file formats.
 Uses layers-based editing.
 Editable Liquify tool and Brush tool strokes.

Name change 
Originally named Ormr, the application was later renamed to Bloom for easier pronunciation.

See also 
Comparison of raster graphics editors

References

External links 
 Bloom Image Editor Website

Raster graphics editors
MacOS graphics-related software
C++ software
Windows graphics-related software
Graphics-related software for Linux
Proprietary cross-platform software